{{Use the great man of Bihar
 English|date=September 2017}}
This is a list of notable residents of Patna (formerly Pataliputra), Bihar, India.

Historical
 Aryabhata, great mathematician-astronomer
 Ashoka, Indian emperor of the Maurya Dynasty
 Bhai Jiwan Singh, Sikh General and friend of Guru Gobind Singh
 Chanakya, teacher, philosopher, and royal advisor
 Chandragupta Maurya, founder of the Mauryan Empire
 Guru Gobind Singh, tenth of the ten Sikh Gurus
 Moggaliputta-Tissa, Buddhist monk and scholar
 Samudragupta, third ruler of the Gupta Dynasty

Nationalists and independence activists
Bindeshwari Dubey, freedom fighter and former Chief Minister of Bihar
Indradeep Sinha, freedom fighter and communist leader
Jagannath Sarkar, leader, freedom fighter, and writer
Jayaprakash Narayan, Indian independence activist, social reformer and political leader
K. B. Sahay, former Chief Minister of unified Bihar
K.P. Jayaswal, also a historian and lawyer
Shah Ozair Munemi, Indian independence activist.
Syed Abuzar Bukhari, a prominent figure of the freedom movement of undivided India; Pakistani Muslim scholar, orator, poet, writer, former president of Majlis-e-Ahrar-e-Islam
Tarkeshwari Sinha, active role in the Quit India Movement
Thakur Ramapati Singh, freedom fighter, politician, former MLA and Minister of Bihar, former MP
Yogendra Shukla, Indian nationalist and freedom fighter.

Writers and scholars
HMJ Sir Khan Bahadur Khuda Bakhsh, Eminent Persian, Arabic and Hindustani Scholar, Founder of Khuda Bakhsh library
Abdul-Qādir Bīdel, representative of Persian poetry and Sufism in India and Central Asia
Acharya Kishore Kunal, retired IPS Officer and Sanskrit scholar
Bhabatosh Datta, economist, academic and writer
Hrishikesh Sulabh, Hindi writer
Kumari Radha, Magahi poet
Muhammad Shams-ul-Haq Azimabadi, Islamic scholar
R. K. Sinha, English scholar
Ram Avatar Sharma, Sanskrit scholar and academic
Ram Karan Sharma, Sanskrit poet and scholar
Siyaram Tiwari, Hindi scholar and author
Sulaiman Nadvi, historian, biographer, litterateur and scholar of Islam
Syed Ata Ullah Shah Bukhari, Islamic Hanafi Deobandi scholar
Talib Jauhari, Pakistani Islamic scholar, religious leader
Raza Naqvi Wahi, preeminent Indian Urdu language poet; known for Tanz-o-Mazah Shayari

Authors
Anurag Anand
Hetukar Jha, author, professor, researcher, and Fulbright Scholar
Kalanath Mishra
Sahajanand Saraswati
Satinath Bhaduri, novelist and politician
Saurav Jha, writer
Vikram Seth, novelist and poet

Holders of high constitutional offices
HMJ Sir Khan Bahadur Khuda Bakhsh, former Chief Justice of Hyderabad State, Founder of khuda bakhsh oriental library
Abdul Ghafoor, former chief minister of Bihar
Anugrah Narayan Sinha, first Deputy Chief Minister of Bihar
Arun Singh, former union minister of state for defence in the Government of India
Ashok Sekhar Ganguly, industry expert and former chairman of Hindustan Lever, former member of Rajya Sabha
Bali Ram Bhagat, former speaker of Lok Sabha
Balmiki Prasad Singh, 14th Governor of Sikkim
Bhuvaneshwar Prasad Sinha, 6th Chief Justice of India
Bidhan Chandra Roy, second chief minister of West Bengal
Dilip Sinha, Ambassador and Permanent Representative of India to United Nations in Geneva
Dinesh Nandan Sahay, former Governor of Tripura and Governor of Chhattisgarh
Hamoodur Rahman, seventh Chief Justice of Pakistan
Lalit Mohan Sharma, 24th Chief Justice of India
Lieutenant General (Retd.) Srinivas Kumar Sinha, former Governor of the states of Jammu & Kashmir and Assam
Mohammad Yunus, first Prime Minister (Premier) of Bihar province in British India
Muni Lall, minister of state for labour and employment in Third Vajpayee Ministry
Nikhil Kumar, former governor of Nagaland and Governor of Kerala
Nitish Mishra, former Minister of the Department of Rural Development, Government of Bihar
Ram Dulari Sinha, former Union Minister and former Governor of Kerala
R. N. Ravi, Governor of Tamil Nadu and Former Deputy NSA of India
Shyam Saran, former Foreign Secretary, Government of India
Tejendra Khanna, former Lieutenant Governor of Delhi

Politicians
Ashok Kumar, Bihar MLA
C. P. Thakur, current member of Rajya Sabha and Vice-President of Bhartiya Janata Party
Digvijay Narain Singh, former Member of Parliament
Ganesh Prasad Singh, former Member of Parliament
Ganga Sharan Singh (Sinha), former Member of Parliament
Jagat Prakash Nadda, Union Minister of Health and Family Welfare
Kiran Ghai, national vice president of the Bharatiya Janata Party
Kishori Sinha, former Member of Parliament
Lalu Prasad Yadav, former Chief Minister of Bihar.
Meira Kumar, former speaker of Lok Sabha
Madan Prasad Jaiswal, founding member of the Bharatiya Janata Party political party, former MP
Mehboob Ali Kaiser, Member of Parliament
Nitish Kumar, chief minister of Bihar
Prem Chandra Mishra, Member of Legislative Council, Former Bihar NSUI Chief 
Putul Kumari, former Member of Parliament
Rajiv Pratap Rudy, Member of Parliament and Minister of State for Skill development and Entrepreneurship
Rajiv Ranjan Singh, former Member of Parliament
Ram Kripal Yadav, Member of Parliament
Ram Govind Singh, Former Mayor, Former Chairman, Legislative Council
Ranjan Prasad Yadav, former Member of Parliament
Ravi Shankar Prasad, Minister of Communications and Information Technology and Minister of Law and Justice in Government of India
Rita Verma, former Minister of State of Mines and Minerals in the Indian government
Sushil Kumar Modi, former Deputy Chief Minister and Finance Minister of Bihar
Shyama Singh, former Member of Parliament
Surur Hoda, socialist politician
Syed Hasan Imam, former President of the Indian National Congress
Uday Singh, former Member of Parliament
Yashwant Sinha, former finance minister of India

Entertainment
Abhimanyu Singh, actor
Amardeep Jha, film actress and television personality
Anshuman Singh, actor and superstar 
Bijoya Ray, filmmaker
Chhavi Pandey, Indian television and movie actress and singer
Daler Mehndi, singer
Deepali Kishore, singer
Imtiaz Ali, Indian film director, actor and writer
Kabeer Kaushik, Bollywood film director and screenwriter
Kranti Prakash Jha, Bollywood film actor
Manjul Sinha, TV director
Manoj Bajpayee, Actor
Mika Singh, singer, composer, performer and songwriter
Nitu Chandra, actress
Pankaj Jha, TV actor and painter
Pankaj Tripathi, Actor
Pariva Pranati, actress
Poonam Sinha, actress
Prachi Sinha, Bollywood actress
Prakash Jha, filmmaker 
Pranati Rai Prakash, winner of India's Next Top Model 2016 edition; a finalist of Miss India 2015
Prasun Banerjee, singer
Rajesh Kumar, TV actor
Roshan Seth, British actor
Sandeep Das, Tabla player and composer
Sanjai Mishra, comedian and film actor
Shatrughan Sinha, actor and member of parliament
Shekhar Suman, film actor and a television personality
Siyaram Tiwari, Indian classical singer
Sonakshi Sinha, actress
Suhasini Mulay, actress
Sushant Singh Rajput, theater, television and film actor
Vineet Kumar, Indian actor

Arts
Pranava Prakash
Shambhavi Singh, painter
Subodh Gupta, painter

Sports
Kunal Datta, cricketer
Moin-ul-Haq, former General secretary Indian Olympic Association
Saba Karim, cricketer
Subroto Banerjee, cricketer
Christopher Oldfield, cricketer
Veer Pratap Singh, cricketer

Bureaucracy
Abhayanand, Director General of Police, Bihar and educationalist
J. K. Sinha, former IPA and Special Secretary of the Research and Analysis Wing (RAW)
N. K. Singh, former Indian Administrative Service and now Member of Parliament
Prasun Mukherjee, former Commissioner of Police in Kolkata Police department
S. K. Majumdar, IAF officer

Business
Anil Agarwal, founder and Executive Chairman of the United Kingdom-based Vedanta Resources PLC
Iqbal Z. Ahmed, Pakistani businessman and philanthropist
Nikhil Sinha, software development engineer, Amazon Web Services

Journalists
Amitava Kumar, writer and journalist
Kanchan Gupta, Indian journalist, political analyst, and activist
Robert Loughnan, New Zealand farmer, journalist and politician
Sweta Singh, anchor of the Hindi news channel Aaj Tak
Ravish Kumar, works in the NDTV
Mammen Mathew, works in the Hindustan Times

Others
A. A. Khan, physicist
Anand Kumar, mathematician and founder member of Super 30
Narendra Kumar Pandey, Padma Shri awardee (2014), medical surgeon, founder of Asian Institute of Medical Sciences
Ashutosh Mukherjee, educator
Bindeshwar Pathak, sociologist
Brajkishore Prasad, lawyer
Creighton Carvello, British mnemonist
Faz Husain, pizza shop owner, Muslim community leader, and politician
Gauri Ayyub, social worker, activist, writer and teacher
Gopal Prasad Sinha, neurologist, politician, member of the Institutional Ethical Committee of the Indian Council of Medical Research
Makhdoom Yahya Maneri, Sufi saint
Manish Mehrotra, award-winning chef
Marshall D. Moran, American Jesuit priest, missionary
Nidhi Yasha, Indian costume designer
Papiya Ghosh, historian and professor
Pravrajika Shraddhaprana, third president of Sri Sarada Math
Ram Sharan Sharma, historian and academic
Ratan Kumar Sinha, Chairman of Atomic Energy Commission of India
Sake Dean Mahomed, traveller, surgeon and entrepreneur
Sanjaya Lall, development economist
Shahn Majid, mathematician and theoretical physicist
Shaibal Gupta, social scientist, founder Member-Secretary of Asian Development Research Institute
Subhav Sinha, innovator
Sujoy K. Guha, biomedical engineer
Syed Ata-ul-Mohsin Bukhari, leader of Majlis-e-Ahrar-e-Islam
Syed Ata-ul-Muhaimin Bukhari, president of Majlis-e-Ahrar-e-Islam Pakistan
T. Sher Singh, lawyer
Tathagat Avatar Tulsi, physicist

See also

List of people from Bihar

References

 
Patna
Patna-related lists